Superior Township is the name of the following places in the U.S.:

 Superior Township, Chippewa County, Michigan
 Superior Township, Washtenaw County, Michigan

See also
Superior, Michigan
Superior Township (disambiguation)

Michigan township disambiguation pages